Emmanuel Kenmogne (born September 2, 1980) is a Cameroonian professional footballer who last played as a striker for Persija Jakarta. He previously played for Malaysia Super League side, Kelantan FA.

Career 
Kenmogne began his career with local club, Sable FC, for whom he played in the CAF Champions League 2000. He next joined Africa Sports National of Côte d'Ivoire. Kenmogne moved to Belgium in 2002, where he played for R.A.A. Louviéroise and R.A.E.C. Mons in the Belgian First Division, before joining Royal Antwerp.

Honours

Club
Sable FC
 Cameroon Première Division: 1999
 Super Coupe Roger Milla: 1999

R.A.A. Louviéroise
 Belgian Cup: 2002–03

Individual
 Indonesia Super League Top Scorer: 2014

References

External links 
 
 

1980 births
Living people
Belgian footballers
Belgian expatriate footballers
Cameroonian footballers
Cameroonian expatriate footballers
Belgian Pro League players
Challenger Pro League players
Cypriot First Division players
Olympiakos Nicosia players
Royal Antwerp F.C. players
R.A.E.C. Mons players
R.A.A. Louviéroise players
Expatriate footballers in Belgium
Expatriate footballers in Cyprus
Cameroonian expatriate sportspeople in Ivory Coast
Cameroonian expatriate sportspeople in Belgium
Cameroonian expatriate sportspeople in Indonesia
Expatriate footballers in Ivory Coast
Expatriate footballers in Indonesia
Sable FC players
Liga 1 (Indonesia) players
Persija Jakarta players
Persebaya Surabaya players
Association football forwards